USS Crater (AK-70) was the lead ship of her class of converted liberty ship cargo ships in the service of the US Navy in World War II. She was first named after John James Audubon, an American ornithologist, naturalist, and painter. She was renamed and commissioned after the constellation Crater, she was the only ship of the Navy to bear this name.

Construction
John James Audubon was laid down 28 August 1942, under a Maritime Commission (MARCOM) contract, MC hull 420, by Permanente Metals Corporation's, Yard No. 2, Richmond, California. She was launched 8 October 1942, sponsored by Mrs. Mary Elisabeth Cornelison Wetsel, the wife of Captain George Wetsel, the public works officer of Mare Island Naval Shipyard. John James Audubon was transferred to the US Navy, 22 October 1942. She was renamed Crater and commissioned 31 October 1942.

Service history
Clearing San Francisco 10 November 1942, Crater delivered cargo to Efate and Espiritu Santo, New Hebrides, and Nouméa, New Caledonia before arriving at Wellington, New Zealand, 28 June 1943 to repair and reload.

Crater continued to carry cargo from New Zealand and other supply bases to Guadalcanal and throughout the Solomons until 21 June 1944, when she sailed to operate in the Marshalls and Marianas through the summer. She returned to Guadalcanal, resuming operations in the southwest Pacific until 1 March 1945, when she cleared for overhaul at San Francisco.

She delivered cargo from the west coast at Samar, Philippines, and departed 26 July for Auckland. Crater carried cargo from Auckland and Brisbane, Australia, to Saipan, the Philippines, Manus, Nouméa, and Eniwetok until 5 February 1946, when she sailed for Pearl Harbor, arriving 24 February.

Decommissioning
After a voyage to San Pedro, Los Angeles, Crater was decommissioned at Pearl Harbor 25 June 1946, and was transferred to MARCOM the next day.

Final disposition
Resuming the name John James Audubon on 26 June 1947, after being transferred to the War Shipping Administration (WSA), she was laid up in the Suisun Bay Reserve Fleet, Suisun Bay, California.

On 26 August 1974, she was sold for $466,668 to Seangyong Trading Company, Ltd., Seoul, South Korea, for scrapping. The scrapping of John James Audubon was completed on 30 March 1975.

References

Bibliography

External links

 

Crater-class cargo ships
World War II auxiliary ships of the United States
Ships built in Richmond, California
1942 ships
Suisun Bay Reserve Fleet